André Alexis Fevret (24 October 1941 – 2 July 2006) was a French rower. He competed in the men's eight event at the 1964 Summer Olympics.

References

External links
 

1941 births
2006 deaths
French male rowers
Olympic rowers of France
Rowers at the 1964 Summer Olympics
Place of birth missing
World Rowing Championships medalists for France